Hans Engell (born 8 October 1948) is a Danish former politician and journalist, who until 6 September 2007 was the editor-in-chief of the tabloid Ekstra Bladet, a position he had held for seven years. As a member of the Conservative People's Party, he was Defence Minister of Denmark between 1982 and 1987, Justice Minister between 1989 and 1993, and leader of the party from 1993 to 1997, until he retired in disgrace after a drunk-driving accident.

Hans Engell is currently a political commentator and analyst in Ekstra Bladet and on Danish television (e.g. TV 2 News and Jersild Live). On 6 September 2007, Hans Engell was fired as editor-in-chief of Ekstra Bladet because JP/Politikens Hus wanted the successful editor of 24timer, Poul Madsen, to lead the paper due to fierce competition in the newspaper industry.

References

External links
 Biography at ft.dk 
 

1948 births
Danish Defence Ministers
Danish Justice Ministers
21st-century Danish newspaper editors
Ekstra Bladet editors
Living people
Members of the Folketing
Politicians from Copenhagen
Leaders of the Conservative People's Party (Denmark)